Edward Tesdorpf (7 September 1817 – 2 May 1889), was a German-Danish landowner, agricultural pioneer and sugar manufacturer. He became the owner of ten estates many of which were located in the Lolland-Falster area where he resided at Orupgaard near Nykøbing Falster where he founded a sugar factory in 1884. Several of the estates are still owned by his descendants, including Gjedsergaard and Pandebjerg on Falster.

Early life
Tesdorpf was born in Hamburg as the son of a wealthy merchant.

Career
 
He came to Denmark where he acquired Orupgård on the island of Lolland in 1840. He later acquired many other large properties, including Pandebjerg (1878) on Falster and Sædlingegård (1871) on Lolland, until he finally owned ten estates across Denmark with a total area of 2,400 hectares. He was a dynamic and innovative farmer, introducing a style of farming which was widely recognized as a model to be emulated. He thoroughly drained and fertilized the land, pioneered the use of steam power and new machinery in Danish agriculture, brought in new breeds of cattle and built a dairy, achieving a five-fold increase in production by 1890. He established Nykøbing Falster Sugar Factory in Nykøbing Falster in 1884.  He founded Nykøbing Falster Sukkerfabrik in Nykøbing Falster in 1884.

Personal life
Tesdorpf died at Orupgaard in 1889. He is buried at Idstrup Cemetery on Falster.

He was married to Mary née Büsch (1820-1875). They had the sons Frederik Tesdorpf and Adolph Tesdorpf and the daughter Ida Charlotte Sophie Tesdorph.

Titles and honours
 
Tesdorpf was from 1860 to 1888 one of the presidents of Landhusholdningsselskabet. He was appointed an honorary member of the organisation when he retired from the post and was awarded its gold medal as the first recipient in 36 years. He was also an honorary member of the Royal Agricultural Society of England.

Tesdorpf was appointed an etatsråd in 1860, konferensråd in  1885 and gehejmekonferensråd in 1888. He received the Kommandørkorset of 2nd degree in 1872  and of the first degree in 1887.

Danish agricultural organisations commissioned a statue of him from Theobald Stein after his death. It was installed in the gardens of the Royal Danish Agricultural College in Frederiksberg in 1893. It has later been moved to Tesdorpfsvej which is named after him. Nykøbing Falster is also home to a memorial.

References

External links

1817 births
1889 deaths
19th-century Danish landowners
German emigrants to Denmark
Businesspeople from Hamburg
People from Guldborgsund Municipality
People from Lolland